Reachin', released in 2002, is the first studio album from the jam band Family Groove Company.

Track listing
"Agenda"  – 5:19
"Just Like I Planned"  – 5:48
"Christy"  – 6:29
"As Abe Was Walking"  – 8:01
"Flowers for Gisa"  – 3:57
"I'd Sing"  – 6:04
"One's on the Way"  – 8:01
"Interesting Changes"  – 6:49
"Seein'"  – 4:17
"The Rattler"  – 10:19

References

Family Groove Company albums
2002 debut albums